Tift may refer to:

Places
Tift County, Georgia, a county in south-central Georgia, United States

People with the given name
Tift Merritt (born 1975), American singer-songwriter

People with the surname
Andrew Tift (born 1968), British portraitist
Asa Tift ( 19th century), American salvager 
Nelson Tift (1810-1891), American jurist, businessman, sailor and politician
Ray Tift (1884-1945), American baseball player

See also
Tift County School District
Tift County High School
Tift College
Tift County Courthouse